Marion Clignet (born 21 February 1964) is a French former track cyclist. Clignet was diagnosed with epilepsy at the age of 22 and was shunned by the United States Cycling Federation, and she subsequently raced for France since 1991. She rode at three Olympic Games for France.

Palmarès 

1990
  National Road Championships
  Road race

After 1990, Clignet competed in the French national championships

1991
 National Track Championships
  Individual pursuit
 National Road Championships
  Road race
Road World Championships
  Team time trial (with Nathalie Gendron, Catherine Marsal and Cécile Odin)
 Track Cycling World Championships, Stuttgart
  Individual pursuit

1992
 National Track Championships
  Individual pursuit
 National Road Championships
  Road race

1993
 National Road Championships
  Road race

 2nd, Overall, Grande Boucle Féminine Internationale
 Track Cycling World Championships, Hamar
  Individual pursuit

1994
 1st, Chrono des Herbiers
 Track Cycling World Championships, Palermo
  Individual pursuit

1995
 National Track Championships
  Individual pursuit

1996
 National Track Championships
  Individual pursuit
 National Road Championships
  Individual time trial
 Track Cycling World Championships, Manchester
  Individual pursuit
 1st, Overall, Tour du Finistère
 1st, Prologue
 1st, Stage 1
 1st, Stage 2
 1st, Stage 3
 1st, Stage 4
 1st, Stage 5
 Olympic Games, Atlanta
  Individual pursuit
 5th, Road race

1999
 National Track Championships
  Individual pursuit
  Points race
 Track Cycling World Championships, Berlin
  Individual pursuit
  Points race
 Track Cycling World Cup
 1st, Individual pursuit, Cali
 1st, Points race, Cali

2000
 National Track Championships
  Individual pursuit
  Points race
 National Road Championships
  Individual time trial
 Track Cycling World Championships, Manchester
  Points race
 Olympic Games, Sydney
  Individual pursuit
 1st, Route Féminine Du Vignoble Nantais

2003
 National Track Championships
  Individual pursuit
 Track Cycling World Cup
 2nd, Points race, Sydney

References

External links 

Cyclingnews: Marion Clignet's Back (Early 2000)

French female cyclists
Cyclists at the 1992 Summer Olympics
Cyclists at the 1996 Summer Olympics
Cyclists at the 2000 Summer Olympics
Olympic cyclists of France
Olympic silver medalists for France
Cyclists from Chicago
People with epilepsy
UCI Road World Champions (women)
1964 births
Living people
Olympic medalists in cycling
Officers of the Ordre national du Mérite
UCI Track Cycling World Champions (women)
American female cyclists
Medalists at the 2000 Summer Olympics
Medalists at the 1996 Summer Olympics
American track cyclists
21st-century American women